Máximo Fernández Alvarado  (1858–1933) was a Costa Rican politician.

Born in Desamparados in 1858, he graduated as a Bachelor in Philosophy and Letters at the University of Santo Tomas at fourteen years old and as a lawyer in the same institution in 1881 with merit.

He occupied several important positions, among them these are Secretary of State, Deputy and President of the Constitutional Congress 1913–1914 and 1916–1917. He founded the Partido Republicano, an ideology that combined doctrines of liberalism and populism, and was a candidate to the presidency in Costa Rican elections of 1902, 1906 and 1913. On several occasions he was exiled for political reasons. He also published a poetic anthology.

He died in San José in 1933.

References

1858 births
1933 deaths
People from Desamparados (canton)
Government ministers of Costa Rica
Presidents of the Legislative Assembly of Costa Rica
Costa Rican exiles
Costa Rican liberals